The Art of Love is a 1965 technicolor comedy film directed by Norman Jewison and starring James Garner, Dick Van Dyke, Elke Sommer, and Angie Dickinson.

The film involves an American artist in Paris (Van Dyke) who fakes his own death in order to increase the worth of his paintings (new paintings keep "posthumously" hitting the market).  His conniving pal (Garner) sells the paintings and withholds the proceeds while the artist toils in a shabby garret.

The picture was written by Carl Reiner (from a story by Richard Alan Simmons and William Sackheim). The supporting cast features Carl Reiner and Ethel Merman.

Jewison noted in his autobiography that the film's flaw was that the script assumes that an artist's death guarantees a huge increase in the sales value of his paintings. That hurt audiences' responses to the movie enormously.

All of the paintings that were used in the movie were the work of international artist Don Cincone.

Plot
An aspiring artist, Paul Sloane, struggles in Paris and wants to return home to America to resume his relationship with his rich fiancee, Laurie.  His best friend and roommate, Casey Barnett, tries to talk him out of it.  When a beautiful woman, Nikki Donay, suddenly leaps into the river Seine to escape a man's attentions, Paul jumps in to save her. They make it to a barge, but Casey and everyone else is under the mistaken impression that neither survived.  Casey gets an idea—a dead artist's paintings could now be very valuable, particularly considering the publicity given Paul's heroic attempt to save the damsel in distress. He begins selling Paul's work, but when the artist himself reappears, very much alive, they hatch a scheme. Paul will pretend to still be dead while continuing to produce paintings for Casey to sell.  Matters become further complicated when Laurie comes to Paris. Casey falls in love with her. This infuriates his best friend, resulting in Paul seeking revenge by slipping evidence to the police that Casey actually murdered him to profit from the art. Casey is tried, convicted and sentenced to death, by guillotine. Paul attempts to save Casey at the last minute.

Cast

James Garner	.... 	Casey Barnett
Dick Van Dyke	.... 	Paul Sloane/Toulouse aka Picasso
Elke Sommer	.... 	Nikki
Angie Dickinson	.... 	Laurie Gibson
Ethel Merman	.... 	Madame Coco La Fontaine
Carl Reiner	.... 	Rodin
Pierre Olaf	        .... 	Carnot
Miiko Taka	        .... 	Chou Chou
Roger C. Carmel	.... 	Zorgus
Irving Jacobson	.... 	Mr. Fromkis
Jay Novello	.... 	Janitor
Paul Préboist	.... 	Bus Driver

References

External links
 
 
 
 James Garner Interview on the Charlie Rose Show
 James Garner interview at Archive of American Television

1965 films
1965 comedy films
American comedy films
1960s English-language films
Films about fictional painters
Films directed by Norman Jewison
Films produced by Ross Hunter
Films scored by Cy Coleman
Films set in Paris
Films with screenplays by Carl Reiner
Universal Pictures films
1960s American films